Man from Atlantis is a short-lived American science fiction/fantasy television series that ran for 13 episodes on the NBC network during the 1977–78 season, following four television films that had aired earlier in 1977. Ratings success by these movies led to the commissioning of a weekly series for the 1977–78 season, but it was canceled at the end of the first season due to a declining audience and high production costs.

Plot 

The series stars Patrick Duffy as an amnesiac man given the name of Mark Harris, believed to be the only surviving citizen of the lost civilization of Atlantis. He possesses exceptional abilities, including the ability to breathe underwater and withstand extreme depth pressures, and superhuman strength. His hands and feet are webbed, his eyes are unusually sensitive to light, and he swims using his arms and legs in a fashion suggestive of an underwater butterfly stroke or dolphin kick.  Following his discovery, he is recruited by the Foundation for Oceanic Research, a governmental agency that conducts top secret research and explores the depths of the ocean in a sophisticated submarine called the Cetacean.

The supporting cast includes Belinda J. Montgomery as Dr. Elizabeth Merrill (who had nursed Mark Harris back to health) and Alan Fudge as C. W. Crawford, Jr., both of the Foundation for Oceanic Research. Victor Buono played the villainous Mr. Schubert in the pilot and several episodes of the series. Kenneth Tigar appeared in the second, third, and fourth movies as Dr. Miller Simon, M.D., also of the Foundation for Oceanic Research. The series added an ensemble cast as "The Crew of the Cetacean", consisting of Richard Laurance Williams, J. Victor Lopez, Jean Marie Hon (who had also been seen in Ark II), and Anson Downes. In the 12th episode, a new female lead character replaced Elizabeth Merrill, Dr. Jenny Reynolds, played by actress Lisa Blake Richards.  (Belinda Montgomery had managed to get out of her contract with the help of lawyers.) The last episode did not feature any female lead character.

Production

The show was produced by Herbert Franklin Solow's studio Solow Production Company, a company spun off from the live-action arm of American animation studio Hanna-Barbera Productions. The Foundation for Oceanic Research headquarters building was represented by the Point Fermin lighthouse in San Pedro, California. The Cetacean submarine's voyages were shown through miniature work by the special effects team of Gene Warren.

Critical reaction
Critic Tom Shales, reviewing the show for the Washington Post, opined that "kids may be impressed" by the heroics and special effects, but the show lacked "adult appeal" and that the stories would "soon wear thinner than water".

Episodes

Television movies

Series

Home media
The pilot film was released on VHS in 1986 by Worldvision Home Video, and re-released in 1987 by Goodtimes Home Video. It was later released on DVD as a part of the Warner Archive collection from Warner Home Video on October 6, 2009.  On July 26, 2011, Warner Bros. released Man from Atlantis: The Complete TV Movies Collection, featuring all four television films, as well as Man from Atlantis — The Complete Television Series for Region 1 DVD. The pilot film was released on Blu-ray by Warner Archive Collection on March 12, 2019.

International releases
Man from Atlantis was the first American television series to be shown in the People's Republic of China in 1980, with the title translated to "The Man from the Bottom of the Atlantic". It was at the time when the "Gang of Four" lost power to Deng Xiaoping, and science research began to get attention, along with economic development. In Brazil it was named O Homem do Fundo do Mar (The Man from the Bottom of the Sea in Portuguese). In Portugal, the title was a direct translation of the original, O Homem da Atlântida, being screened on RTP1. In Kuwait, it was released in the early 1980s in English with Arabic subtitles. In the Netherlands, the series was broadcast by TROS broadcasting association, from June 15, 1978 until September 5, 1980. In Germany, the series was broadcast by ARD from 1982 to 1983 and in 1988 by RTL plus with the title translated to Der Mann aus Atlantis. The show preserved its name in France as well, where it aired as L'Homme de l'Atlantide. In Turkey, the series also preserved its name and was broadcast as Atlantis'ten Gelen Adam. It was also shown on SABC in South Africa in 1979, with the original title.

In the United Kingdom, Man from Atlantis was shown, in most regions, in an early Saturday evening slot on ITV starting 24 September 1977. After airing the four television movies, the series was shown at an earlier time from 5 November 1977, opposite the BBC's long-running sci-fi series Doctor Who, which was then in its 15th season. Although Man from Atlantis had not been a ratings/audience-share or demographic success in the US, the series actually beat Doctor Who during its transmission in the UK. (This happened again in 1980–81 when ITV screened Buck Rogers in the 25th Century against Doctor Who.) In Italy, the series was one of the early successes of the then interregional network Telemilano, future Canale 5, that began to air the series on February 11, 1980 under the name L'Uomo di Atlantide. The first TV-film, Man from Atlantis, was released on video in Norway in the 1980s. In Israel, the Man from Atlantis was shown on Channel 1, the only channel at that time. HaIsh MeAtlantis, a literal translation of the English title, also enjoyed reruns.

Adaptations
In 1977, Dell Publishing published a novelization titled Man from Atlantis #1, written by Richard Woodley, which was followed by Man from Atlantis #2: "Death Scouts" from the same author. The line continued unnumbered with Killer Spores (1977) and Ark of Doom (1978), also by Woodley, the latter being the retitled novelization of "The Disappearances". In 1978, Marvel Comics published seven issues of a Man from Atlantis comic book, written by Bill Mantlo with art by Frank Robbins and Frank Springer. At the same time as Marvel, Look-In, in the UK, began publishing a comic strip; this one was drawn by Mike Noble (and later John Cooper for one story). It was short-lived, lasting less than a year before being replaced with Enid Blyton's Famous Five. Kenner began development on a Man from Atlantis line of action figures and toy vehicles in 1977, but it never proceeded past the prototype stage, while Denys Fisher Toys passed on making Star Wars action figures for the UK as they thought the Man from Atlantis would be more successful.

Series star Patrick Duffy wrote a sequel novel, titled simply Man from Atlantis, which was published in June 2016. The 'blog space1970, which reported on this novel, described it thus:

Notes

References

External links
  (pilot)
  (series)
 

1970s American science fiction television series
1977 American television series debuts
1978 American television series endings
NBC original programming
Television series by Warner Bros. Television Studios
Television shows adapted into comics
1978 comics debuts
Science fiction comics
Marvel Comics titles
Fictional Atlanteans
Fictional mermen and mermaids
Atlantis in fiction
Underwater civilizations in fiction
Television shows about telepathy